The 1980 British Speedway Championship was the 20th edition of the British Speedway Championship. The Final took place on 4 June at Brandon in Coventry, England. The Championship was won by Dave Jessup, who scored a 15-point maximum. Former two-time champion Michael Lee finished as the runner-up, with Phil Collins in third.

Final 
4 June 1980
 Brandon Stadium, Coventry

See also 
 British Speedway Championship
 1980 Individual Speedway World Championship

References 

British Speedway Championship
Great Britain